was a renowned Japanese photographer.

References

Japanese photographers
1916 births
1997 deaths